The Women's 100 metre individual medley competition of the 2021 FINA World Swimming Championships (25 m) will be held on 18 and 19 December 2021.

Records
Prior to the competition, the existing world and championship records were as follows.

Results

Heats
The heats were started on 18 December at 10:12.

Semifinals
The semifinals were started on 18 December at 19:08.

Final

References

Women's 100 metre individual medley
2021 in women's swimming